Saqib Sumeer is a Pakistani actor, director and writer who performs mostly in theatre and also works in television and films. 

He made his cinematic debut in 2017 with Yasir Nawaz's Mehrunisa V Lub U. He is also known for his roles, as Dilawar in Khuda Aur Muhabbat (season 3) and Rafique Ali in Raqeeb Se.

He’s also a director, having directed plays such as Hatim Tai in 2019, that he also co-wrote and where he played the leading role of Hatim al-Tai.

Early life
Originally from Bahawalpur, he moved to Karachi to study acting at NAPA, where for 3 years his mentor was veteran actor Zia Mohyeddin, but he was unable to make a name in dramas because he wasn’t considered "handsome enough", so he concentrated on scriptwriting and theatre, endorsing mainly comic roles in Shah Sharabeel’s plays.

Filmography

Films
 Mehrunisa V Lub U

Theatre 
 Bombay Dreams
 Avanti
 Beech
 Bahara Ki Raat Ka Sapna
 Bananistan
 Tom Dick and Harry

Television

Webseries

References 

Pakistani male writers
Pakistani male stage actors
Pakistani male film actors
Pakistani male television actors
National Academy of Performing Arts alumni
Living people

Year of birth missing (living people)